Swertia bimaculata is a plant species in the family Gentianaceae.

References

External links

bimaculata
Taxa named by Charles Baron Clarke